The missing man formation is an aerial salute performed as part of a flypast of aircraft at a funeral or memorial event, typically in memory of a fallen pilot, a well-known military service member or veteran, or a well-known political figure.  The planes fly in a formation with a space where one plane should be, symbolizing the person's absence.

Missing man formations are also used in motorsport in memory of a recently deceased driver and in American football in memory of a recently deceased player.

Description 

Several variants of the formation are seen. The formation most commonly used in the United States is based on the "finger-four" aircraft combat formation composed of two pairs of aircraft. The aircraft fly in a V-shape with the flight leader at the point and their wingman on their left.  The second element leader and his wingman fly to their right. The formation flies over the ceremony low enough to be clearly seen and the second element leader abruptly pulls up out of the formation while the rest of the formation continues in level flight until all aircraft are out of sight.

In an older variant, the formation is flown with the second element leader position conspicuously empty. In another variation, the flight approaches from the south, preferably near sundown, and one of the aircraft will suddenly split off to the west, flying into the sunset. In all cases, the aircraft performing the pull-up, split off, or missing from the formation is honoring the person (or persons) who has died, and is representing their departure.

Examples

Origins
In 1936, King George V received the first recorded flypast for a non-RAF funeral. The United States adopted the tradition in 1938 during the funeral for Major General Oscar Westover with over 50 aircraft and one blank file. By the end of World War II, the missing man formation had evolved to include the pull-up. In April 1954, United States Air Force General Hoyt Vandenberg was buried at Arlington National Cemetery without the traditional horse-drawn artillery caisson. Instead, Vandenberg was honored by a flyover of jet aircraft with one plane missing from the formation.

Aerial salutes
On January 31, 1986, four NASA T-38s flew the missing man formation over Johnson Space Center to honor the STS-51L Challenger crew.

On November 26, 1999, four Air Force F-16s flew the missing man formation over Kyle Field to honor the 12 Texas A&M students who died during the Aggie Bonfire collapse.

The Delaware Air National Guard flew the missing man formation over the Dover International Speedway on June 3, 2001 to honor NASCAR driver Dale Earnhardt Sr., who had died in a wreck on the final lap of the 2001 Daytona 500 race earlier that year.

On June 9, 2004, during the State Funeral of President Ronald Reagan, 21 Air Force F-15E Strike Eagles from the 4th Fighter Wing, Seymour Johnson Air Force Base in North Carolina, flew over in a missing man formation.

In December 2004, as a final tribute to Prince Bernhard of the Netherlands's former military role in the Royal Netherlands Air Force, three modern F-16 jet fighters and a World War II Spitfire performed a missing man formation during his funeral.

On September 13, 2007, two days after two Bo 105 helicopters operated by the Swedish Air Force collided, four Saab JAS 39 Gripen performed the missing man formation when relatives to the pilots, accompanied by Micael Bydén, visited the crash site.

On May 25, 2012, the Royal Norwegian Air Force performed the flypast at the funeral of World War II resistance fighter Gunnar Sønsteby, Norway's most highly decorated citizen.

The missing man formation was flown at a family memorial service in Indian Hill, Ohio on 31 August 2012 in honour of former American astronaut, US Navy pilot, and test pilot Neil Armstrong, the first man to walk on the Moon.

In November 2014 the state memorial service for former Australian Prime Minister Gough Whitlam, who had served as a navigator in the Royal Australian Air Force during World War II, concluded with a missing man formation flight conducted by four RAAF F/A-18 Hornet fighters.

On 29 March 2015, the Republic of Singapore Air Force's Black Knights planned to fly the missing man formation as an aerial salute to long-serving former Prime Minister Lee Kuan Yew during his funeral procession from Parliament House to the University Cultural Centre of the National University of Singapore. However, they could not due to rain, low overcast clouds and low visibility; instead they flew over, above the cloud.

On March 11, 2016, Fairchild Republic A-10 Thunderbolt IIs, also known as Warthogs, performed a missing man formation flyover at Arlington National Cemetery in Arlington, Virginia. The Warthogs flew over the burial service for retired US Air Force Col. Avery Kay, considered the father of the A-10.

On September 18, 2017, a missing man formation was performed by three Sukhoi-30MKI of the Indian Air Force during the funeral ceremony of Marshal of the Indian Air Force Arjan Singh in New Delhi.

In October 2017, the Spanish Air Force performed a missing man formation as a tribute to two pilots who died in separate accidents within a week.

On September 2, 2018, the Virginia-based Super Hornets flew the formation over the United States Naval Academy in Annapolis, Maryland, at the end of the interment ceremony for Senator John McCain.

On October 23, 2018, a missing man formation was flown for Jon Thocker, a stunt pilot who died during a performance on October 13. The formation was flown by 12 RV aircraft at Lunken Airport.

On December 6, 2018, a missing man formation was flown at the funeral of President George H. W. Bush, who was a distinguished naval aviator. This formation included 21 aircraft.

On 22 February 2019, around 8:45 am, a "finger-four" missing man formation was flown over Sheffield, England as part of a flypast of aircraft to honour the 75th anniversary of B-17 "Mi Amigo" crashing after returning from a mission.

On 19 February 2019 a missing man formation was flown by the Surya Kiran Aerobatic Team of Indian Air Force to honour Wg Commander Sahil Gandhi who was killed when he was practicing for the display for Aero India 2019, two aircraft crashed on that day in Bangalore.

On 12 February 2020, a missing wingman formation was flown in honor Kenya's second president, Daniel Toroitich Arap Moi, after a 19-gun salute, during his funeral at his Kabarak home.

On March 13, 2020, a missing man formation was flown by the Pakistan Air Force to honor Wing Commander Nauman Akram who was killed when his F-16 crashed near Shakarparian, Islamabad during Pakistan Day Parade rehearsals.

On May 3, 2020, a missing man formation was flown by the RCAF Snowbirds over 12 Wing Shearwater to honor the crew of a CH-148 Helicopter operating aboard HMCS Fredericton that was lost in the Ionian Sea on April 30 during a training exercise.

On October 26, 2021, a missing man formation was flown by six DH Chipmunks in honour of Squadron Leader Bill Purchase MBE during his funeral in Peterborough (England). Purchase had a distinguished flying career with the Royal Air Force, and became synonymous with the DH Chipmunk, the aircraft type he flew around the world as part of operation Northern Venture.

Memorials

Permanent memorial sculptures depicting the missing man aerial formation exist at Randolph Air Force Base (Missing Man Monument, 1977, Mark Pritchett) in San Antonio, Texas, Joint Base Pearl Harbor–Hickam (Missing Man Memorial, 1995) in Honolulu, Hawaii, and Valor Park (Missing Man Formation, 2000) near the National Museum of the United States Air Force in Dayton, Ohio.

Outside the United States, a missing man memorial was dedicated at the Militaire Luchtvaart Museum (2004, Leendert Verboom) near Soesterberg Air Base to commemorate the 21 June 1944 crash of the Consolidated B-24 Liberator "Connie" following a bombing raid in Germany; it was moved to the  museum near Rijsenhout in 2014.

Motorsport 
The missing man formation is also used in various types of motorsport to commemorate the death of a driver, rider, or official. In case of a rolling start, during the pace laps before the race begins, the driver in the pole position drops back a row into the second row and the field paces with no vehicle in the lead position. This was done during the 2001 Dura Lube 400 at Rockingham by Jeff Gordon, in honor of Dale Earnhardt following his death the week before at the Daytona 500. Similarly, the pole position on a starting grid can be left empty for a standing start.

After the deaths of Ayrton Senna and Roland Ratzenberger in the 1994 San Marino Grand Prix, in the next race in Monaco, the first two grid positions were left empty and painted with the colors of their home countries' flags - Brazil and Austria, respectively.

American football 
The missing man formation has been frequently used by American football teams to commemorate the death of a teammate. Typically, on the first play in which the fallen player would have appeared, the team takes the field with only ten players, leaving his position in the formation open. The team will usually then take a delay of game, with their opponent declining the penalty.

On September 1, 2007 the USC Trojans college football team performed the missing man. After scoring their first touchdown, USC lined up for the extra point without a kicker in tribute to teammate Mario Danelo who had died just after the 2006 season.

On December 2, 2007 the NFL's Washington Redskins (now known as the Washington Commanders) lined up for their first defensive play of the game with 10 men in honor of safety Sean Taylor who died on November 27, 2007.

On September 3, 2016 the Nebraska Cornhuskers college football team lined up in punt formation without a punter on their first fourth down in their game against the Fresno State Bulldogs to honor punter Sam Foltz, who died in a traffic accident on July 23, 2016.

On December 12, 2021, the Denver Broncos lined up with 10 men in formation for their first play of the game against the Detroit Lions in honor of former wide receiver Demaryius Thomas, who had died on December 9, 2021.

In popular media 
In the 2000 film Thirteen Days, a missing man formation is observed as Major Rudolf Anderson, USAF body is returned home from Cuba.

In the 2022 film Top Gun: Maverick, a missing man formation is observed at the funeral of Admiral Tom "Iceman" Kazansky.

In the 2016 film Batman v Superman, a missing man formation is observed at the funeral of Superman. 

In the 1986 film Iron Eagle, a missing man formation is observed for Lt. Col. Charles "Chappy" Sinclair who is presumed to have died on impact in the Mediterranean Sea.

In the 2013 film Furious 7, the characters drove a land vehicle version of the aerial missing man formation in memory of the passing of Paul Walker.

See also
Riderless horse
Three-volley salute

References

Death customs
Military aviation
Military traditions
Motorsport terminology